J. C. M. Merrillat House, also known as Hunter House, is a historic house located at Staunton, Virginia. It was built in 1851, and is a two-story, five bay, Gothic Revival style frame cottage with a two-story wing.  It has board-and-batten siding and a gable roof interrupted by a large central gable with a finial.  The front facade features a one-story porch supported by large brackets.  It was built by Dr. J. C. M. Merrillat, a prominent early administrator at the nearby Virginia School for the Deaf and Blind.

It was added to the National Register of Historic Places in 1982. It is located in the Gospel Hill Historic District.

References

Houses on the National Register of Historic Places in Virginia
Carpenter Gothic houses in Virginia
Houses completed in 1851
Houses in Staunton, Virginia
National Register of Historic Places in Staunton, Virginia
Individually listed contributing properties to historic districts on the National Register in Virginia
1851 establishments in Virginia